"Suffer Little Children" is a song by the English rock band the Smiths, written by singer Morrissey and guitarist Johnny Marr. It was included on The Smiths in February 1984 and as a B-side to the May 1984 single "Heaven Knows I'm Miserable Now".

Background
The song is about the Moors murders that took place on Saddleworth Moor, which overlooks Manchester, between 1963 and 1965. At the time of their deaths, many of the victims were only a few years older than Morrissey (born 1959), who wrote the lyrics of the song after reading a book about the murders, Beyond Belief: A Chronicle of Murder and its Detection by Emlyn Williams.

"Suffer Little Children" was one of the first songs that Morrissey and Johnny Marr wrote together.
 
The title of the song is a phrase found in the Gospel of Matthew, chapter 19, verse 14, in which Jesus rebukes his disciples for turning away a group of children and says:

Lyrics
Although five children were murdered in the Moors murders case, only three are named in the song: John Kilbride ("oh John you'll never be a man"), Lesley Ann Downey ("Lesley Ann with your pretty white beads"), and Edward Evans ("Edward, see those alluring lights"). The murders of Keith Bennett and Pauline Reade were not attributed to Myra Hindley and Ian Brady until 1985, after "Suffer Little Children" had already been released.

The phrase "Hindley wakes and Hindley says; Hindley wakes, Hindley wakes, Hindley wakes, and says: 'Oh, wherever he has gone, I have gone'" is likely a pun on the title of Hindle Wakes, a silent film which made use of location filming in Blackpool and Manchester, based on a play by Stanley Houghton, one of the Manchester School of playwrights.

Reception

Controversy
First released on The Smiths in February 1984, it was re-released in May as a B-side of the single "Heaven Knows I'm Miserable Now". The Manchester Evening News reported that relatives of the Moors murder victims had taken exception to the lyrics, in which three of the victims are mentioned by name. Some newspapers also claimed that the single's sleeve photo of Viv Nicholson was intended to resemble Myra Hindley.

Subsequently, Boots and Woolworths withdrew both the album and single from sale. Morrissey later established a friendship with Ann West, the mother of Moors victim Lesley Ann Downey, after she accepted that the band's intentions were honourable.

Covers
The song has been covered by several artists, including Hole throughout their 2010 tour.

References

1984 songs
The Smiths songs
Songs written by Morrissey
Songs written by Johnny Marr
Songs inspired by deaths
Songs about child abuse
Songs based on actual events
Obscenity controversies in music